Ranjith Sankar is an Indian Filmmaker who works in Malayalam films. He started his movie career with the 2009 thriller film Passenger. Sankar followed Passenger up with Arjunan Saakshi (2011),Molly Aunty Rocks (2012), Punyalan Agarbattis (2013), Varsham (2014), Su.. Su... Sudhi Vathmeekam (2015), Pretham (2016),  Ramante Eden Thottam (2017), Punyalan Private Limited (2017), Njan Marykutty (2018) Pretham 2 (2018), Kamala (2019) and Sunny (2021). Sankar launched his production house Dreams N Beyond in 2012 and his distribution house Punyalan Cinemas in 2017.

Biography

Born in Thrissur, Kerala, India, Ranjith Sankar completed his education at St. Thomas College in Thrissur and studied BTech Civil Engineering at  Mar Athanasius College of Engineering Kothamangalam. Shankar's writing career began with television series such as Nizhalkal and  American Dreams. He won the Kerala State Award for Best Screenplay for American Dreams.

In 2009 he madePassenger.

Molly Aunty Rocks (2012) starring Revathy and Prithviraj was Dreams n Beyond's first production, a critical and commercial success His next film was Punyalan Agarbattis (2013), a satire featuring Jayasurya, Nyla Usha, Innocent, Rachana Narayanankutty and Aju Varghese.

His next movie Varsham starring Mammootty, Asha Sarath and Mamta Mohandas was released in November 2014. The film was a huge commercial and critical success and Mammootty won several awards for his role in it. This was followed by a biographical film Su.. Su... Sudhi Vathmeekam in November 2015. 

Ranjith Sankar's third film with Jayasurya, a horror comedy titled "Pretham" was released in August 2016. It has been remade in Telugu.

Ramante Edanthottam was his next, a best-selling movie on female empowerment. He followed it up with sequels to Punyalan and Pretham titled Punyalan Private Limited and Pretham2. He launched his distribution company Punyalan Cinemas with Punyalan Private Limited which was another major commercial success.

He made Njan Marykutty in 2018 which was the first commercial movie in India with a transgender person as protagonist. Jayasurya played Marykutty which won two Kerala State Awards and had a major run in film festivals. 

The experimental thriller Kamala was released in 2019.

Filmography

Awards

 Kerala State Awards
 Best screenplay (Television) for the 2003 serial American Dreams

 Dubai AMMA Awards
 Best Socially Committed movie Director - Passenger
 Best Debut director - Passenger

 Asianet Film Awards
 Best screenplay - Passenger
 Popular film  - Pretham

 Kerala Film Critics Awards
 Special Jury Award for direction - Passenger

 World Malayali Council - Kairali Awards
 Best Screenplay - Passenger

 Surya TV Awards
Best Debut director

 V Santharam Awards
Best Debut director (Nomination)

 Filmfare Awards
Best Director (Nomination)

 SouthScope Awards
Best Director (Nomination)

 Other awards
2009: First Lohithadas Puraskaram for best screenplay

References

External links
 Official blog
sify.com

http://www.rediff.com/movies/report/south-review-arjunan-saakshi/20110131.htm
sify.com
https://web.archive.org/web/20101225020705/http://www.metromatinee.com/artist/Ranjith%20Shankar-1953
http://www.expressbuzz.com/entertainment/Entertainstory.aspx?Title=Ranjiths+%E2%80%98Arjunan..%E2%80%99+will+be+an+action+thriller&artid=pjS1h1lMAZY=&SectionID=TPEu9LXF3Wk=&MainSectionID=TPEu9LXF3Wk=&SectionName=T0d/vXfniiY=&SEO=
http://varnachitram.com/2009/10/12/interview-with-ranjith-sankar-part-2/

21st-century Indian film directors
Living people
Film directors from Thrissur
Malayalam film directors
Malayalam screenwriters
People from Thrissur
Year of birth missing (living people)
Writers from Thrissur
21st-century Indian dramatists and playwrights
Screenwriters from Kerala
21st-century Indian screenwriters